Sir William Denis Battershill KCMG (29 June 1896 – 11 August 1959) was a British colonial administrator. He was Governor of Cyprus from 1939 to 1941 and Governor of Tanganyika from 1945 to 1949. He was largely known for taking land that had previously been set aside for German settlers during the era of German East Africa and redistributing it to indigenous Africans. He also sought to increase the role of Africans in government by increasing African participation in voting and by replacing European officials with African officials. Battershill also saw to it that it was illegal to pay Africans less than Europeans or Asians for doing the same work in Tanganyika. In the early 1950s he was given a tour of French Algeria, French Guinea and French Indochina. In all of those territories he said that based on the way France was governing he felt the French were "driving those territories into the arms of communism." He also briefly visited Britain's Sierra Leone Colony and Protectorate as well as Bermuda, the Cayman Islands and Anguilla, which he favorably compared to France's colonies. He was of the opinion that Britain's African colonies "can and should govern themselves independently" and that he hoped they would have a positive relationship with Britain once they did, however he warned that the French were alienating people in the three French colonies of French Algeria, French Guinea and French Indochina and the end result of that would be those countries "both separating from France, and also having an acrimonious relationship with her once they do."

References 

1896 births
1959 deaths
Governors of Tanganyika (territory)
Knights Commander of the Order of St Michael and St George
British people in British Cyprus